Roswell Hopkins Rudd Jr. (November 17, 1935 – December 21, 2017) was an American jazz trombonist and composer.

Although skilled in a variety of genres of jazz (including Dixieland, which he performed while in college), and other genres of music, he was known primarily for his work in free and avant-garde jazz. Beginning in 1962 Rudd worked extensively with saxophonist Archie Shepp.

Biography
Rudd was born in Sharon, Connecticut, United States. He attended the Hotchkiss School and graduated from Yale University, where he played with Eli's Chosen Six, a dixieland band of students that Rudd joined in the mid-1950s. The sextet played the boisterous trad jazz style of the day, and recorded two albums, including one for Columbia Records. His collaborations with Shepp, Cecil Taylor, John Tchicai, and Steve Lacy grew out of the lessons learned while playing rags and stomps for drunken college kids in Connecticut. Rudd later taught ethnomusicology at Bard College and the University of Maine.

On and off, for a period of three decades, he assisted Alan Lomax with his world music song style (Cantometrics) and Global Jukebox projects.

In the 1960s, Rudd participated in free jazz recordings such as the New York Art Quartet; the soundtrack for the 1964 movie New York Eye and Ear Control; the album Communications by the Jazz Composer's Orchestra; and in collaborations with Don Cherry, Larry Coryell, Pharoah Sanders, and Gato Barbieri. Rudd had lifelong friendships with saxophonists Shepp and Lacy, and performed and recorded the music of Thelonious Monk with Lacy.

Rudd and his producer and partner Verna Gillis went to Mali in 2000 and 2001. His album MALIcool (2001) is a cross-cultural collaboration with kora player Toumani Diabaté and other Malian musicians.

In 2004, Rudd brought his Trombone Shout Band to perform at the 4th Festival au Désert in Essakane, Tombouctou Region, Mali. In 2005, he extended his reach further, recording an album with the Mongolian Buryat Band, a traditional music group of musicians from Mongolia and Buryatia, entitled Blue Mongol. He also conducted master classes and workshops both in the United States and around the world.

Rudd died of prostate cancer on December 21, 2017, at home in Kerhonkson, New York. His archives were donated to the Worcester Polytechnic Institute.

Awards and honors
 Nomination: Grammy Award for Best Vocal Performance Male and Best Jazz Instrumental Album, Monk's Dream (1999)
 Trombonist of the Year, Jazz Journalists Association (2003–05, 2009–10)
 Best Trombonist, Down Beat Critics' Poll (2010)

Discography

As leader or co-leader

With the New York Art Quartet
1965: New York Art Quartet (ESP-Disk)
1965: Mohawk (Fontana Records)
2000: 35th Reunion (DIW Records)
2010: Old Stuff (Cuneiform)
2013: Call It Art (Triple Point): contains five LPs (four hours) of previously unreleased material and a 150-plus-page coffee-table book

As sideman
 1957 Eli's Chosen 6, Yale University Dixieland Band (Columbia)
 1961 New York City R&B, Buell Neidlinger, Cecil Taylor (Mosaic)
 1962 Into the Hot, Gil Evans/Cecil Taylor (Impulse)
 1963 School Days, Steve Lacy, Dennis Charles, Henry Grimes (Hathut)
 1964 Four for Trane, with Archie Shepp (Impulse)
 1966 Until, with Robin Kenyatta (Atlantic)
 1966 Archie Shepp Live in San Francisco, with Archie Shepp (Impulse)
 1966 Mama Too Tight, with Archie Shepp (Impulse)
 1966 New York Eye and Ear Control, Don Cherry, Albert Ayler, John Tchicai and Gary Peacock (ESP-Disk)
 1967 Life at the Donaueschingen Music Festival, with Archie Shepp (SABA)
 1968 The Jazz Composer's Orchestra, Michael Mantler (JCOA)
 1969 The Third World, Gato Barbieri (Flying Dutchman)
 1971 Escalator over the Hill, Carla Bley (JCOA)
 1971 Liberation Music Orchestra, Charlie Haden (Impulse)
 1974 Village on the Left, Marcello Melis and Don Moye (Soul Note)
 1975 Trickles, Steve Lacy, Beaver Harris, Kent Carter (Soul Note)
 1976 Maine, with Hans Dulfer, Arjen Gorter, and Martin van Duynhoven (Bvhaast)
 1976 Dinner Music, with Carla Bley (Watt)
 1977 The New Village on the Left, with Marcello Melis and Enrico Rava, Don Moye, Gruppo Rubanu (Black Saint)
 1977 European Tour 1977, with Carla Bley (Watt)
 1978 Enrico Rava Quartet, Enrico Rava, J.F. JennyClarke and Aldo Romano (ECM)
 1979 Divine Song, with Sangeeta Michael Berardi, Rashied Ali, Eddie Gomez, Archie Shepp (Sunjump)
 1979 Musique Mecanique with Carla Bley (Watt)
 1981 Interpretations of Monk, as part of groups led by Muhal Richard Abrams, Barry Harris, Anthony Davis, and Mal Waldron (DIW)
 1984 That's the Way I Feel Now: A tribute to Thelonious Monk, produced by Hal Willner (A&M)
 1992 Darn it, with Paul Haines (American Clave)
 1994 Dark Was the Night, with Allen Lowe (Music & Arts)
 1995 Wild Weekend, NRBQ and Terry Adams (Virgin)
 1995 Woyzeck's Death, with Allen Lowe (Enja)
 1996 Bladik, Keith Tippett et al. (Cuneiform)
 1996 Rumors of an Incident, with Elton Dean (Slam)
 1996 Terrible, NRBQ and Terry Adams (New World)
 1997 Newsense, with Elton Dean (Slam)
 2002 Seize the Time, Nexus Orchestra (Splasch)
 2003 Sex Mob,  Dime Grind Palace (Ropeadope)
 2006 The Harry Smith Project, one track with Sonic Youth (Shout! Factory)
 2008 Concertos, Michael Mantler (ECM)
 2009 The Light, The Second Approach Trio (Solyd)

References

External links
Roswell Rudd and Verna Gillis feature, nytimes.com, November 23, 2007.
Interview with Roswell Rudd, npr.org, 2002
 Discography, Mindspring.com; accessed December 22, 2017.

1935 births
2017 deaths
People from Sharon, Connecticut
Hotchkiss School alumni
Yale University alumni
Bard College faculty
American jazz trombonists
Male trombonists
Avant-garde jazz trombonists
Free jazz trombonists
Freedom Records artists
Deaths from cancer
Jazz musicians from Connecticut
American male jazz musicians
Eli's Chosen Six members
New York Art Quartet members
Black Lion Records artists
Clean Feed Records artists
Sunnyside Records artists
DIW Records artists
RareNoiseRecords artists